Abdelilah Fahmi (born 3 August 1973 in Casablanca) is a Moroccan former football defender. He last played for Raja Casablanca.

Fahmi appeared in 11 Turkish Super Lig matches for Gaziantepspor during the 2005-06 season.

He was part of the Moroccan 2000 African Nations Cup team, which finished third in group D in the first round of competition, thus failing to secure qualification for the quarter-finals.

Career statistics

International

Honours
Raja Casablanca
Botola (5): 1995-96, 1996–97, 1997–98, 1998-99, 2008–09
Coupe du Trône (1): 1996

References

External links

1973 births
Living people
Moroccan footballers
Footballers from Casablanca
Morocco international footballers
Lille OSC players
RC Strasbourg Alsace players
Raja CA players
Gaziantepspor footballers
Ligue 1 players
Ligue 2 players
Süper Lig players
Qatar Stars League players
Botola players
Al-Khor SC players
Al-Arabi SC (Qatar) players
2000 African Cup of Nations players
2002 African Cup of Nations players
Association football defenders
Moroccan expatriate footballers
Expatriate footballers in France
Expatriate footballers in Qatar
Expatriate footballers in Turkey
Moroccan expatriate sportspeople in France
Moroccan expatriate sportspeople in Qatar
Moroccan expatriate sportspeople in Turkey